Statistics of Latvian Higher League in the 1962 season.

Overview
It was contested by 7 teams, and ASK won the championship.

League standings

References 
 RSSSF

Latvian SSR Higher League
Football 
Latvia